The 1989–90 European Cup was the 25th edition of the European Cup, IIHF's premier European club ice hockey tournament. The season started on October 13, 1989, and finished on February 4, 1990.

The tournament was won by CSKA Moscow, who won the final group.

First group round

Group A
(Rotterdam, Netherlands)

Group A standings

Group B
(Bern, Canton of Bern, Switzerland)

Group B standings

Group C
(Zagreb, SR Croatia, Yugoslavia)

Group C standings

Group D
(Frederikshavn, Denmark)

Group D standings

 TPS,
 Djurgårdens IF,
 Tesla Pardubice,
 CSKA Moscow    :  bye

Second group round

Group A
(Bern, Canton of Bern, Switzerland)

Group A standings

Group B
(Rosenheim, Bavaria, West Germany)

Group B standings

Final Group
(Berlin, West Germany)

Final group standings

References
 Season 1990

1989–90 in European ice hockey
IIHF European Cup